"Iko Iko" is a much-covered New Orleans song that tells of a parade collision between two tribes of Mardi Gras Indians and the traditional confrontation. The song, under the original title "Jock-A-Mo", was written and released in 1953 as a single by James "Sugar Boy" Crawford and his Cane Cutters but it failed to make the charts.

The song first became popular in 1965 by the girl group the Dixie Cups, who scored an international hit with "Iko Iko". In 1967, as part of a lawsuit settlement between Crawford and the Dixie Cups, the trio were given part songwriting credit for the song. In 1972, Dr. John had a minor hit with his version of "Iko Iko". In the UK, a version recorded by Scottish singer Natasha England in 1982 made it to the top 10. "Iko Iko" became an international hit twice more, the first being the Belle Stars in June 1982 and again with Captain Jack in 2001. An adaptation by Papua New Guinea artist Justin Wellington under the title "Iko Iko (My Bestie)" featuring the Solomon Island duo Small Jam became an international hit in 2021 after a successful TikTok challenge.

Sugar Boy and his Cane Cutters version

Background
The song was originally recorded by and released as a single in November 1953 by James Crawford as "Sugar Boy and his Cane Cutters", on Checker Records (Checker 787). The single features Dave Lastie on tenor saxophone. Crawford's version of the song did not make the charts. The story tells of a "spy boy" (i.e. a lookout for one band of Indians) encountering the "flag boy" or guidon carrier for another "tribe". He threatens to "set the flag on fire". Crawford set phrases chanted by Mardi Gras Indians to music for the song. Crawford himself states that he has no idea what the words mean, and that he originally sang the phrase "Chock-a-mo", but the title was misheard by Chess Records and Checker Records president Leonard Chess, who misspelled it as "Jock-a-mo" for the record's release.

"Sugar Boy" Crawford's story
James Crawford, gave a 2002 interview with OffBeat Magazine discussing the song's meaning:

The Dixie Cups version

Background
The Dixie Cups' version was the result of an unplanned jam in a New York City recording studio where they began an impromptu version of "Iko Iko", accompanying themselves with drumsticks on an aluminum chair, a studio ashtray and a Coke bottle. After their producers cleaned up the track and added the backup vocals, bass and drums to the song, the single was then released in March 1965. The Dixie Cups scored an international hit single with "Iko Iko" in May 1965 on the Billboard Hot 100 chart where their version peaked at number 20 and spent 10 weeks on the Top 100. The song also charted at number 23 on the UK Singles Chart and peaked at number 20 on the R&B Chart. In Canada "Iko Iko" reached number 26 on the RPM Chart. It was the third single taken from their debut studio album Chapel of Love issued on Red Bird Records in August 1964.

The Dixie Cups had learned "Iko, Iko" from hearing the Hawkins sisters' grandmother sing it, but they knew little about the origin of the song and so the original authorship credit went to the members, Barbara Ann Hawkins, her sister Rosa Lee Hawkins, and their cousin Joan Marie Johnson.

The Dixie Cups' version was later included on the soundtrack to the 1987 film The Big Easy. This same version was also used on the soundtrack of the 2005 film The Skeleton Key. In 2009, a version based on the Dixie Cups' was used in an ad for Lipton Rainforest Alliance Ice Tea.

Legal battles
After the Dixie Cups version of "Iko Iko" was a hit in 1965, they and their record label, Red Bird Records, were sued by James Crawford, who claimed that "Iko Iko" was the same as his composition "Jock-a-mo". Although the Dixie Cups denied that the two compositions were similar, the lawsuit resulted in a settlement in 1967 with Crawford making no claim to authorship or ownership of "Iko Iko", but being credited 25% for public performances, such as on radio, of "Iko Iko" in the United States. A comparison of the two recordings demonstrates the shared lyric and melody between the two songs, though the arrangements are different in tempo, instrumentation and harmony. Crawford's rationale for the settlement was motivated by years of legal battles with no royalties. In the end, he stated, "I don't even know if I really am getting my just dues. I just figure 50 percent of something is better than 100 percent of nothing."

In the 1990s, the Dixie Cups became aware that another group of people were claiming authorship of "Iko Iko". Their ex-manager Joe Jones and his family filed a copyright registration in 1991, alleging that they wrote the song in 1963. Joe Jones successfully licensed "Iko Iko" outside of North America. The Dixie Cups filed a lawsuit against Joe Jones. The trial took place in New Orleans and the Dixie Cups were represented by well-known music attorney Oren Warshavsky before Senior Federal Judge Peter Beer. The jury returned a unanimous verdict on March 6, 2002, affirming that the Dixie Cups were the only writers of "Iko Iko" and granting them more money than they were seeking. The Fifth Circuit Court of Appeals upheld the jury verdict and sanctioned Joe Jones.

Chart performance

Dr. John version

Background
New Orleans singer and pianist Dr. John covered "Iko Iko" in 1972 for his fifth studio album Dr. John's Gumbo. Released as a single in March 1972 on Atco Records, his version of the song charted at number 71 on the Billboard Hot 100 chart. It was produced by Jerry Wexler and Harold Battiste. The "Iko Iko" story, is told by Dr. John in the liner notes to his 1972 album, Dr. John's Gumbo, in which he covers New Orleans R&B classics:

Dr. John, playing himself, performs the song in the "movie" Polynesian Town on the May 22, 1981, episode of the Canadian comedy show SCTV.

Dr. John performed the song during halftime of the 2008 NBA All-Star Game in New Orleans and again in 2014.

Chart performance

Natasha version

Background
The most successful charting version in the UK was recorded by the Scottish singer Natasha (full name Natasha England), whose version reached number 10 on the UK singles chart in 1982. Natasha's single was one of two competing versions of "Iko Iko" in the Official Singles Chart Top 40 of week ending 19 June 1982, a chart run-down which saw Natasha at number 24, eleven places higher than the version released by The Belle Stars on Stiff Records. The song also charted highly in Ireland, Israel and New Zealand. The single was produced by Tom Newman. A remix of the single was released in 2007, and Natasha's version enjoyed a resurgence in 2014 when it was included on the soundtrack to the highest-grossing Italian film of 2014, A Boss in the Living Room (Un Boss in Salotto).

Chart performance

Weekly charts

Year-end charts

The Belle Stars version

Background
In 1989, the British girl group the Belle Stars had a US chart hit with their cover of "Iko Iko", which reached number 14 on the Billboard Hot 100 chart in March, after it was included on the soundtrack of the film Rain Man, starring Tom Cruise and Dustin Hoffman. The single was issued on Capitol Records. Their song is in the opening scene of the 1988 film.

It was originally released several years earlier on Stiff Records in 1982 as a single in the UK, where it peaked at a modest number 35 on the UK Singles Chart in June 1982. The track was produced by Brian Tench and was also featured on the band's eponymous debut album, The Belle Stars, which reached number 15 on the UK Albums Chart.

The Belle Stars version was also included in the 1997 film Knockin' on Heaven's Door  and The Hangover in 2009.

Music video
A music video was used to promote the single. The music video features scenes from the Rain Man movie as well as Belle Stars lead singer Jennie McKeown wearing a black outfit with blue dangling treble clefs and bleach blond dreadlocks. Jennie is also accompanied by four dancing girls in colorful outfits and a dancing man trying to persuade a subdued man. The original music video uses the 1989 remix which samples Woo! Yeah! from Lyn Collins's Think (About It). On the bridge, a line from the Thunderbirds episode Ricochet is also heard on the remix.

Chart performance

Weekly charts

Year-end charts

Captain Jack version

Background
The German Eurodance act Captain Jack recorded a cover version of "Iko Iko" for their fourth studio album, Top Secret in 2001. It was released on E-Park Records. The single was produced by Udo Niebergall and Eric Sneo. Captain Jack's version was a hit in several countries, reaching number 22 in Germany, number 62 in Switzerland and peaking at number 16 in Austria.

Chart performance

Justin Wellington version

Background
Papua New Guinean singer Justin Wellington recorded his version of "Iko Iko" in 2017, featuring Solomon Islands group Small Jam. It was not a strict cover but rather an adaptation. The track was released by Sony Music UK on June 3, 2019, and started to gain popularity in 2021 after it went viral on social platform TikTok. This version makes various changes to the lyrics of some verses, and has its own musical original sections, but keeps the chorus the same. It was later added alongside the TikTok dance into the video game Fortnite Battle Royale. The track has proven very successful charting high internationally in many countries.

Other Justin Wellington versions
"Iko Iko (My Bestie)" - Justin Wellington & Digital Farm Animals feat. Small Jam
"Iko Iko (My Bestie) (Down Lo Remix)" - Justin Wellington feat. Small Jam
"Iko Iko (My Bestie) (Imanbek Remix) - Justin Wellington feat. Small Jam
"Iko Iko (My Bestie) (Summer 2021 Version)"  (with an alternative music video)
"Iko Iko (My Bestie) - Justin Wellington & Pedro Capó feat. Small Jam

Chart performance

Weekly charts

Year-end charts

Certifications

Interpretations

Translations 
Linguists and historians have proposed a variety of origins for the seemingly nonsensical chorus, suggesting that the words may come from a melange of cultures.

From Louisiana Creole 
An interpretation in Louisiana Creole French is:

From Mobilian Jargon 
Linguist Geoffrey D. Kimball derives the lyrics of the song in part from Mobilian Jargon, an extinct American Indian trade language consisting mostly of Choctaw and Chickasaw words and once used by Native Americans, Blacks, and European settlers and their descendants in the Gulf Coast Region. In Mobilian Jargon,  (interpreted as jockomo feeno) was a commonly used phrase, meaning 'very good'.

Another possible translation interprets the third and fourth lines as:

From West African languages 
In a 2009 OffBeat article, the Ghanaian social linguist Evershed Amuzu said the chorus was "definitely West African", reflecting the tonal patterns of the region. He notes that the phrase —often doubled as —is a popular chant meaning 'well done', or 'congratulations' among the Akan and Ewe people in modern-day Togo, Ghana, and Benin. Both groups were frequently taken in the slave trade, often through Haiti to Louisiana. Ewes in particular are credited with bringing West African cultural influences like Vodun rites to Haiti and on to New Orleans.

Musicologist Ned Sublette has backed the idea that the chorus might have roots in Haitian slave culture, considering that the rhythms of Mardi Gras Indians are nearly indistinguishable from the Haitian Kata rhythm. Yaquimo, he has also noted, was a common name among the Taíno inhabitants of Haiti in the early years of the slave trade.  is also, whether coincidentally or not, the phrase "The black cat is here" in Bambara, a West African Manding language.

In a 1991 lecture to the New Orleans Social Science History Association, Sybil Kein proposed the following translation from Yoruba and Creole:

Louisiana Voodoo 
Louisiana Voodoo practitioners would recognize many aspects of the song as being about spirit possession. The practitioner, the horse, waves a flag representing a certain god to call that god into himself or herself. Setting a flag on fire is a curse. The man in green, who either changes personality or whose appearance is deceiving, would be recognized in Voodoo as possessed by a peaceful Rada spirit, inclining to green clothes and love magic. The man in red, who is being sent to kill, would likely be possessed by a vengeful Petwo spirit.

Haitian ethnologist Milo Rigaud published a transcription in 1953 of a Voodoo chant, "Crabigne Nago". This chant to invoke the Voodoo mystère Ogou Shalodeh is similar to "Iko, Iko" in both pentameter and phones.Liki, liki ô! Liki, liki ô!
Ogou Shalodeh.
Papa Ogou Jacoumon,
Papa Ogou Shalodeh.

References

External links
 [ Origins of the song "Iko Iko"] - AllMusic website

1953 songs
1965 singles
1972 singles
1982 singles
1989 singles
Aaron Carter songs
Atco Records singles
The Belle Stars songs
Bubblegum pop songs
Capitol Records singles
Checker Records singles
Cyndi Lauper songs
The Dixie Cups songs
Dr. John songs
Grateful Dead songs
Mardi Gras in New Orleans
Mardi Gras songs
Red Bird Records singles
Songs about New Orleans
Stiff Records singles